Co mój mąż robi w nocy (What Is My Husband Doing Tonight?) is a 1934 Polish musical comedy film directed by Michał Waszyński.

Plot 
Industrialist Roman Tarski moves from Krakow to Warsaw. He is a co-owner of a thriving construction company "Żel-Beton", but one day the other partner runs away with the company's money. Tarski tries to make ends meet, but this task is very difficult because his wife, Stefa, does not know about the new situation and is having fun as before.  Tarski sells his wife's jewelry, while the bailiff seizes the movable property of their home. Their maid's fiancé is the waiter, from whom Tarski accidentally learns that the waiter always has money. Faced with this perspective, he takes a job as a waiter for the Alhambra night dance. In addition, he simulates a break-in into his own home, during which he allegedly lost money and jewels from the box. The new job, which Roman Stefie is not talking about, consumes whole nights, which causes her anxiety and suspicions of betrayal. One day he catches Tarski playing with their maid. So she asks her admirer, Baron Lolo, to find out what her husband is doing at night. After many adventures and misunderstandings, everything ends happily and the dishonest partner is caught. Thanks to this, Tarski gets his money back.

Cast
Michał Znicz ...  Roman Tarski 
Maria Gorczyńska ...  Stefa Tarska 
Kazimierz Krukowski ...  Baron Lolo Karolescu 
Tola Mankiewiczówna ...  Kazia, maid 
Wojciech Ruszkowski ...  Walery, a waiter 
Romuald Gierasieński ...  Fafula, headwaiter and Kasia's father 
Wiktor Biegański ...  Dr. Djagnozinski 
Konrad Tom ...  The Private Detective 
Paweł Owerłło ...  Manager of the 'Alhambra' 
Fryderyk Jarossy ...  Mr. Picknick 
Elżbieta Barszczewska ...  Kobieta na dancingu 
Eugeniusz Koszutski ...  Workman 
Julia Krzewiński ...  Tenant 
Kazimierz Pawłowski ...  Mężczyzna na dancingu

External links 
 

1934 films
1930s Polish-language films
Polish black-and-white films
Films directed by Michał Waszyński
1934 musical comedy films
Polish musical comedy films